New Irish Hymns (released as In Christ Alone: New Hymns for Prayer and Worship, or for short In Christ Alone in the US) is the first in a series of themed albums created and produced by Keith Getty.

This album features vocalists Máire Brennan, Margaret Becker and Joanne Hogg performing songs by Keith Getty and others (as indicated below). This album also marks the recorded debut of the Christian worship song, “In Christ Alone.” It was released in 2001 in Britain and 2002 in the rest of the world.

Track listing
Your Hand O God Has Guided (One Church One Faith)(by Keith Getty, words adapted from a hymn by E.H. Plumptre)
With the Early Morning (Song of the Kingdom)*(words by Máire Brennan, music by Keith Getty)
Jesus Draw Me Ever Nearer (May This Journey)(words by Margaret Becker, music by Keith Getty)
Hear All Creation(words by Margaret Becker, music by Keith Getty)
My Hope(words by Richard Creighton, music by Keith Getty)
In Christ Alone(words by Stuart Townend, music by Keith Getty)
Like the Starlight (Your Song to Me)*(words by Kristyn Lennox, music by Keith Getty)
O for a Closer Walk(by Keith Getty, words adapted from a hymn by William Cowper)
This Fragile Vessel (Communion)*(words by Máire Brennan, music by Keith Getty)
Over Fields of Green (My Song Shall Rise to You)(words by Joanne Hogg, music by Keith Getty)

* indicates Máire Brennan solo track

Credits 
Keith Getty – Composer, producer, orchestrator, piano
Stephen Doherty – Executive producer
Nigel Palmer – Co-producer
Phil Keaggy, Jason Carter, Pete Kipley, Nick Fletcher, Fionán de Barra – Guitar (tracks not specified)
Terl Bryant – Drums and percussion
Tim Harries – Guitar
Peter Wilson – Background vocals
Troy Donockley – Pipes and whistles
Dónal O'Connor, Dave Davidson, Maeve McKeown – Fiddle
Prague Symphony Orchestra Strings
© 2001 Kingsway Music

Release history

See also
New Irish Hymns (series)

External links 
Getty Music
Kingsway Music
WorshipTogether

References

2001 albums
2002 albums
Christian music albums by artists from Northern Ireland
Moya Brennan albums
Margaret Becker albums
Joanne Hogg albums